The 2014 Georgia Southern Eagles football team represented Georgia Southern University in the 2014 NCAA Division I FBS football season. They were led by first-year head coach Willie Fritz and played their home games at Paulson Stadium. They were first year members of the Sun Belt Conference. In their second year of the FCS to FBS transition, the Eagles were eligible for the conference championship; however, they were not bowl-eligible.

The Eagles finished their inaugural FBS season 9–3 and were undefeated in Sun Belt Conference play at 8–0, clinching the conference championship outright. Additionally, with their victory over Georgia State, the Eagles posted their 300th win in the modern era of Georgia Southern football. The Eagles became only the third team ever to win a conference title in its first FBS season, after Nevada in 1992 (Big West Conference) and Marshall in 1997 (Mid-American Conference). They were also the first team ever to go unbeaten in conference play in their first FBS season. Georgia Southern athletic director Tom Kleinlein filed for a postseason waiver to allow the Eagles to play in a bowl game; however, the NCAA denied Georgia Southern's waiver request and a subsequent appeal due to a sufficient number of "full FBS members" becoming bowl-eligible during the season.

On July 22, 2016, the university announced that it was ordered by the NCAA to vacate two wins from the 2013 season and one win from the 2014 season, due to academically ineligible student-athletes participating in those games. The win affected in the 2014 season was against the Louisiana-Monroe Warhawks; despite vacating this win, the ruling does not affect Georgia Southern's status as the 2014 Sun Belt Conference Football champions.

Schedule

References

Georgia Southern
Georgia Southern Eagles football seasons
Sun Belt Conference football champion seasons
Georgia Southern Eagles football